Brachionichthys is the type genus of the handfish family Brachionichthyidae.  Originally, all species of handfish were included in Brachionichthys, but researchers have since split species off into five additional genera.

Species of handfish use their pectoral fins to walk about on the sea floor. These highly modified fins have the appearance of hands, hence the generic epithet, from Latin brachium meaning "arm" and Greek ichthys meaning "fish". 

The prehistoric handfish, Histiontophorus bassani, from the Lutetian of Monte Bolca, was once described as a species of Brachionichthys.

Species
The currently recognized species in this genus are:
 Brachionichthys australis Last, Gledhill & Holmes, 2007 (Australian spotted handfish) 
 Brachionichthys hirsutus Lacépède, 1804 (Spotted handfish)

References

External links 
 Video of a handfish
 Are handfish walking towards extinction? (podcast) 
 National Geographic, including photos

Brachionichthyidae
Extant Eocene first appearances
Taxa named by Pieter Bleeker
Marine fish genera